Alapin may refer to:

 Semyon Alapin, chess master (1856–1923)
 Sicilian Defence, Alapin Variation (1.e4 c5 2.c3)
 Alapin-Diemer Gambit (1.e4 e6 2.d4 d5 3.Be3)
 Alapin's Opening (1.e4 e5 2.Ne2)